71st Army Division()(2nd Formation) was formed in October 1969 from 3rd Engineer District of Beijing Military Region, and its designation was formally assigned in December.

The division was a part of 24th Army Corps. From 1969 to 1985 the division was composed of:
211th Infantry Regiment;
212th Infantry Regiment;
213th Infantry Regiment;
Artillery Regiment.

In 1983, 213th Infantry Regiment was detached from the division and transferred to the People's Armed Police. No evidence shows whether a new 213th Infantry Regiment  was formed.

In 1985 the division was disbanded.

References
中国人民解放军各步兵师沿革，http://blog.sina.com.cn/s/blog_a3f74a990101cp1q.html

Infantry divisions of the People's Volunteer Army
Infantry divisions of the People's Liberation Army
Military units and formations established in 1969
Military units and formations disestablished in 1985